VentureWell, formerly known as the National Collegiate Inventors and Innovators Alliance (NCIIA), is a private 501(c)(3) organization that funds and trains faculty and student innovators to create successful, socially beneficial businesses. The organization's mission is to create experiential learning opportunities for students and to catalyze student-led ventures that create positive social and environmental impact.

VentureWell's early stage funding and training opportunities supported the creation of more than 180 new businesses across an array of industries, which have leveraged more than $620 million in additional funding.

Origins
In 1995, a group of higher education faculty and administrators gathered at Hampshire College in Amherst, Massachusetts to discuss how universities might provide students with the tools they need to transform their ideas into viable businesses.  Jerome Lemelson, one of the U.S.’s most prolific inventors, convened the meeting.

In the meeting, Lemelson described his vision for an organization that would support educators in implementing a hands-on approach to learning while at the same time helping students develop new products and boost them toward commercialization.

VentureWell was created out of this vision. VentureWell, initially part of Hampshire College’s 
Lemelson National Program and funded primarily by The Lemelson Foundation, became a stand-alone non-profit entity in 2007. It has grown to include a membership of nearly 200 colleges and universities from across the U.S., engaging over 5,000 undergraduate and graduate student entrepreneurs each year.

Activities
VentureWell funds and trains student and faculty innovators through grants, competitions and workshops, committing $1.5 million every year to assist student innovators and the faculty that enable their work.

Success stories
In 2007, Eben Bayer and Gavin McIntyre, two graduating students at Rensselaer Polytechnic Institute, got a $16,000 VentureWell grant that funded a few critical months of development. Ecovative Design—their company makes building insulation and packaging materials from mushrooms, a material they call Greensulate—went on to win awards from the state of New York and Europe's PICNIC Green Challenge, among others.

Another VentureWell-sponsored team from the University of Portland turned a $12,500 grant into a company with more than $2.5 million in annual sales. The company, Keen Healthcare, was founded to commercialize a shock-absorbing crutch and now sells twenty-five different products that help injured, disabled, and elderly people move around more easily.

References

External links
Official website

501(c)(3) organizations